Miguel Ángel Nazarit Mina (born May 20, 1997) is a Colombian footballer.

Career
Nazarit began his professional career with Once Caldas in Manizales. During his three-year tenure with the club, they played in the Colombian Categoría Primera A, the top tier of football in Colombia. A right-footed centerback, Nazarit finished his Once Caldas career with a lone goal in 39 appearances.

On December 16, 2019, his transfer to MLS franchise Nashville SC was announced. He joined Nashville for the team's inaugural 2020 season in MLS.

On 22 January 2021, Nazarit was loaned to Santa Fe for their entire 2021 season.

On 18 January 2022, Nashville opted to waive and buyout Nazarit's contract.

Personal life
Nazarit was born in Cali, Colombia.

Career statistics

Club

References

1997 births
Living people
Nashville SC players
Association football defenders
Major League Soccer players
Colombian footballers
Once Caldas footballers
Expatriate soccer players in the United States
Colombian expatriate footballers
Independiente Santa Fe footballers
Footballers from Cali